The 2007 Men's EuroHockey Nations Championship was the 11th edition of the Men's EuroHockey Nations Championship, the biennial international men's field hockey championship of Europe organized by the European Hockey Federation. It was held in Manchester, England from 19 to 26 August 2007.

The Netherlands won its third title by defeating the defending champions Spain 3–2 in the final. Belgium won its first-ever medal by defeating Germany 4–3.

The top three teams qualified directly for the 2008 Summer Olympics. The other teams qualified for the qualification tournaments for the Summer Olympics.

Qualified teams

Squads

Results

Pool A

Pool B

Fifth to eighth place classification
The points obtained in the preliminary round against the other team are taken over.

Pool C

First to fourth place classification

Semi-finals

Third and fourth place

Final

Statistics

Final standings

(H) Host.

Awards

See also
2007 Men's EuroHockey Nations Trophy
2007 Women's EuroHockey Nations Championship

External links
Official website

 
Men's EuroHockey Nations Championship
Men 1
E
International field hockey competitions hosted by England
EuroHockey Championship Men
2000s in Manchester
International sports competitions in Manchester
EuroHockey Nations Championship
2007